Simon Quarterman (born 14 November 1977) is an English actor and producer, best known for playing narrative director Lee Sizemore in the HBO science fiction drama Westworld. He also portrays Father Ben Rawlings in the supernatural horror film The Devil Inside (2012). He appeared in director William Brent Bell's horror film Wer.

Career
Quarterman also played the role of Ari in The Scorpion King 2: Rise of a Warrior.

He has appeared in several British television shows, including Down to Earth, Midsomer Murders, Holby City, and EastEnders, playing Paul Jenkins, and the miniseries Victoria & Albert.

He currently portrays Lee Sizemore in the HBO science fiction Western TV show Westworld.

Filmography

References

External links

1977 births
Living people
Male actors from Sussex
21st-century British male actors
British male television actors
British male film actors